Country Store is a variety of muesli manufactured by Kellogg's. It is high in fibre and available only in the European Union. It is not sold in the United States due to its higher production cost compared to processed artificial cereals such as Froot Loops and Apple Jacks (using artificial flavours and colours would increase profits for Kellogg's but is illegal in Europe so the company only sells natural cereals there). Country Store was introduced into the United Kingdom and Ireland around 1974 with a TV advert voiced by Michael Jayston.

Ingredients 
Country Store contains a number of natural ingredients, including sugar, brown sugar, glucose-fructose syrup, salt, milk whey powder, oats, maize, wholewheat, sultanas, wheat bran, hazelnuts, dried apple and barley malt flavouring.

External links 
  

Kellogg's cereals
British brands
Irish brands